Enyo taedium is a species of moth in the family Sphingidae. It was described by Schaus, in 1890.

Distribution 
It is found from Mexico and Belize south to Costa Rica, northern Venezuela and Ecuador.

Biology 
Adults are on wing in May in Costa Rica.

The larvae probably feed on Vitus tiliifolia and other members of the Vitaceae and Dilleniaceae families, such as Vitis, Cissus rhombifolia and Ampelopsis, Tetracera volubilis, Curatella americana, Tetracera hydrophila and Doliocarpus multiflorus. Ludwigia of the Onagraceae is also a possible host.

Subspecies
Enyo taedium taedium (Mexico and Belize south to Costa Rica, northern Venezuela and Ecuador)
Enyo taedium australis (Rothschild & Jordan, 1903) (Brazil)

References

Enyo (moth)
Moths described in 1890